The Six Nations Cup is an international darts team competition currently organised by the English Darts Organisation (EDO), run under the auspices of the British Darts Organisation (BDO). It is competed for by the national teams of England, the Netherlands, Northern Ireland, Republic of Ireland, Scotland and Wales.

Background 
First held in 2002 as a men's only competition, only in 2010 was a women's competition held for the first time. The tournament is held annually on the last weekend of February at changing venues in one of the competing countries, which are decided in joint meetings. The national darts organisation of the host country will organise that years competition. The competition must not be staged in the same country that is hosting that years annual British International Championships.

Each national darts organisation names a squad that's consists of six men and four women, of which any five men and three women may play in any match, with one player on standby for each squad (for both the men and women).

The six nations are divided into two groups of three. The top two teams from each group advance to the semi finals. Prior to both semi finals and the final, a 5th/6th place play-off takes place between both groups bottom teams. The format is the same for both the men and women.

Winners

Finals

Placings

References

External links 
Six Nations Cup BDO Darts.
Six Nations Cup Dutch Darts Association.

2002 establishments in the United Kingdom
British Darts Organisation tournaments
Recurring sporting events established in 2002